The 1997 rebellion was caused by the failure of multiple pyramid schemes. The collapse of these schemes caused many Albanians to lose much of their money and property, resulting in widespread protests across Albania, which eventually led to a situation of civil war.

Firms bankrupted 

The unrest of the year 1997 came as a consequence of the bankruptcy of some 25 firms. The face value of the schemes' liabilities totaled $1.2 billion.

Sudja was established in 1993 by Maksude Kadëna, also known as Sudja, who had worked in a shoe factory. Strangely, when Sudja was arrested, she was living in a dilapidated apartment complex. The collapse triggered several protests in Tirana, which was also its area of operation.

Vefa Holding was the main pyramid firm. It was created in 1994 by Vehbi Alimuça and spread across the country. Vefa invested in various fields of the economy such as hotels, fuel, stores and factories. Best known is the bomb attack a few weeks before the elections of 26 May 1996 on Vefa's supermarket in downtown Tirana. Vefa was often seen as the firm's rentier PD. It went bankrupt in 1998, while its president was in prison.

The Gjallica firm was created by three former State Security operatives originating from Kukes. President of the company was Shemsie Kadria. Gjallica had its centre in Vlora. The firm went bankrupt on February 5, 1997, prompting violent protests in Vlora, which later turned into rebellion against the government.

People's Democracy-Xhaferri was established in 1995 and began to extend its activities in the villages of Lushnja, Fier and Berat. Officially, it was a "foundation", but in reality, it became one of the most severe pyramidal firms in the country. Its leader, Rrapush Xhaferri, was arrested on January 22, 1997, which triggered violent demonstrations in Lushnje on January 24–25.

Populli was created on July 16, 1996, and was extended in the same area as the Xhaferri. Its President was Bashkim Driza the former State Security agent. He worked deeply with the Albanian opposition parties and financed their campaigns and newsletters. During the riots of 1997, he left with a U.S. helicopter. In September 2008, on a notice from Albania, the Uruguayan police arrested Bashkim Driza at his apartment in Montevideo. It was discovered that during the last 11 years, he had moved freely between Uruguay, Chile, the Dominican Republic and other Latin American countries. Just as Bashkim Driza was about to be extradited to Albania in February 2009, he escaped from his apartment.

The nine major pyramid firms in relation to creditors were:

References

External links 

 Mega Holdings Albania
 Sudja Song by local singer Myslym Lela
 International Monetary Fund, The Rise and Fall of Pyramid Schemes in Albania
 Impact of Pyramid Schemes on Albania
 Albanian Pyramid Schemes
 World Bank, Albania Under the Shadow of Pyramid Schemes
  The Great Pyramids of Albania, BBC radio documentary by Gavin Haynes.

Albanian Civil War
1997 in Albania
Albania